Frederiksborgvej is a major street in the North-West, Bispebjerg and Emdrup neighbourhoods of Copenhagen , Denmark. The 3 kulimetre long street runs from Frederikssundsvej in the south to the municipal border with Gladsaxe Municipality in the north where it splits into Søborg Hovedgade and Vangedevej.

History
 
Frederiksborgvej was part of the road that Christian IV established in circa 1620 betweenVopenhagen and Frederiksborg Castle. The road ran across Bispebjerg Hill. The land belonged to the farms in the village of Emdrup. It belonged to the parish of Brønshøj.

In 1870 the City of Copenhagen began to by up land in the area and the civil parish of Brønshøk-Husum was merged into Copenhagen in 1901. The area along the road was gradually built over with a combination of housing and industry. Glud og Marstrand occupied a large site bounded by Grederiksborgvej, Rentemestervej, Rebslagervej and Drejervej.

Notable buildings and residents
 
The most notable landmark along the street is Grundtvig's Church. It was inaugurated in 1940 and is designed by Peder Vilhelm Jensen-Klint. Bispebjerg Cemetery is located on the other side of the street. Bispebjerg Chapel has now been decommissioned and is now operated as a venue for dance under the name Dansekapellet (Chapel of Dance). The domed building was designed by Holger Jacobsen.

Bispebjerg Skole (No. 107) was built in 1911-12 to design by Carl Thorning. It was expanded by Axel Ekberg in 1931. Holbergskolen, another public primary school, is located at No. 216.

Public art
In front of the Bispeparken Housing Estate, close to the corner of Tuborgvej, stands a 2.5 m tall figurative sculpture of a snowy owl. It was created by Gunnar Westman and is from 1968. Westman is known for his animal sculptures.

References

External links

Streets in Bispebjerg